Casimir "Slug" Leo Witucki (May 26, 1928 – April 19, 2015) was an American football guard in the National Football League for the Washington Redskins.  He played college football at Indiana University and was drafted in the 21st round of the 1950 NFL Draft.

Early life
Witucki was born in South Bend, Indiana and attended Washington High School.  While there, he played high school football as a guard on teams that went 14-1-4 in 1944 and 1945.  He was awarded All-State honors and was chosen captain in 1945.

College career
Witucki attended and played college football at Indiana University in Bloomington.  He was a four-year letterman and graduated in 1950.

Professional career
Witucki was drafted in the 21st round (266th overall) of the 1950 NFL Draft by the Washington Redskins.  He played for the Redskins in 1950 and 1951, and after military service, from 1953 to 1956.

Military service
Witucki missed the 1952 NFL season because he was called to duty in the United States Air Force during the Korean War.  He was awarded the rank of second lieutenant and was stationed in Japan.  While he was stationed at Ashiya Air Field, he played football for the Ashiya Mustangs.

Personal life
Witucki died April 19, 2015, at Charlotte Hall Veteran's Home, in Charlotte Hall, Maryland.

References

External links
 Pro Football Hall of Fame Korean War Honor Roll 
 

1928 births
2015 deaths
American football offensive guards
United States Air Force personnel of the Korean War
Indiana Hoosiers football players
Players of American football from South Bend, Indiana
Washington Redskins players